The canton of Bourgogne-Fresne (before 2021: Bourgogne) is an administrative division of the Marne department, northeastern France. Its borders were modified at the French canton reorganisation which came into effect in March 2015. Its seat is in Bourgogne-Fresne.

It consists of the following communes:
 
Auménancourt
Bazancourt
Beine-Nauroy
Berméricourt
Berru
Boult-sur-Suippe
Bourgogne-Fresne
Brimont
Caurel
Cauroy-lès-Hermonville
Cormicy
Courcy
Hermonville
Heutrégiville
Isles-sur-Suippe
Lavannes
Loivre
Merfy
Nogent-l'Abbesse
Pomacle
Pouillon
Saint-Étienne-sur-Suippe
Saint-Thierry
Thil
Villers-Franqueux
Warmeriville
Witry-lès-Reims

References

Cantons of Marne (department)